The 1992 Chicago White Sox season was the White Sox's 94th season. They finished with a record of 86-76, good enough for 3rd place in the American League West, 10 games behind the 1st place Oakland Athletics.

Offseason 
 December 4, 1991: Dan Pasqua was signed as a free agent by the White Sox.
 December 9, 1991: Pete Rose Jr. was drafted from the White Sox by the Cleveland Indians in the 1991 rule 5 draft.
 January 10, 1992: Bob Wickman, Domingo Jean and Mélido Pérez were traded by the White Sox to the New York Yankees for Steve Sax.

Regular season

Season standings

Record vs. opponents

1992 Opening Day lineup 
 Tim Raines, LF
 Steve Sax, 2B
 Robin Ventura, 3B
 Frank Thomas, 1B
 George Bell, DH
 Mike Huff, RF
 Ron Karkovice, C
 Lance Johnson, CF
 Ozzie Guillén, SS
 Jack McDowell, P

Transactions 
 March 10, 1992: Bo Jackson was signed as a free agent by the White Sox.
 March 30, 1992: Sammy Sosa and Ken Patterson were traded by the White Sox to the Chicago Cubs for George Bell.
 April 3, 1992: Shawn Abner was signed as a free agent with the Chicago White Sox.
 June 1, 1992: A. J. Hinch was drafted by the Chicago White Sox in the 2nd round of the 1992 amateur draft, but did not sign.
 August 10, 1992: Keith Shepherd was traded by the White Sox to the Philadelphia Phillies for Dale Sveum.

Roster

Player stats

Batting 
Note: G = Games played; AB = At bats; R = Runs scored; H = Hits; 2B = Doubles; 3B = Triples; HR = Home runs; RBI = Runs batted in; BB = Base on balls; SO = Strikeouts; AVG = Batting average; SB = Stolen bases

Pitching 
Note: W = Wins; L = Losses; ERA = Earned run average; G = Games pitched; GS = Games started; SV = Saves; IP = Innings pitched; H = Hits allowed; R = Runs allowed; ER = Earned runs allowed; HR = Home runs allowed; BB = Walks allowed; K = Strikeouts

Awards and honors 

All-Star Game
 Jack McDowell
 Robin Ventura

Farm system

References

External links 
 1992 Chicago White Sox at Baseball Reference

Chicago White Sox seasons
Chicago White Sox season
White